The Soviet Union Olympic football team was the national football team of the Soviet Union from 1952 to 1990. The team participated in all of the qualification football tournaments for Summer Olympics (except for 1980 when it qualified as hosts). Until 1992, when age restrictions were officially introduced, the Soviet Union used the first team both in qualification tournaments and finals except for 1960 and 1964 when the second national team was used for the qualification tournaments (the first team succeeded it in the finals in those years).

History
Officially the Olympic national team was founded in 1959 after the FIFA adopted its decision in 1958 prohibiting players who played in the World Cup finals from participation in the Olympics. The Soviet Union did not participate in the World Cup until 1958 (see 1958 World Cup (qualifications)); instead, it used its first team (base team) to compete at the Olympics (since 1952) as it deemed that tournament more important. The USSR continued to use its best players in the Olympics after 1958 despite the FIFA ruling, with the branding "Olympic team" being rather formal, with all the players being part of the national team and competing both at the World Cup and Olympics.

1960 Olympics

Qualification

3rd Group

Games

Roster

Notes:
 Age on 12 December 1959.

Summer Olympics record
Note:
{| class="wikitable" style="font-size:90%; text-align: center;"
|-
!Host Nation(s) - Year
!Result
!GP
!W
!D*
!L
!GS
!GA
|-
| 1952||Round 1||3||1||1||1||8||9
|- style="background:gold;"
| 1956||Champion ||5||4||1||0||9||2
|-
| 1960||colspan=7 rowspan=3|did not qualify
|-
| 1964
|-
| 1968
|- style="background:#c96;"
| 1972||3rd place ||7||5||2||0||17||6
|- style="background:#c96;"
| 1976||3rd place||5||4||0||1||10||4
|- style="background:#c96;"
| 1980||3rd place ||6||5||0||1||19||3
|-
| 1984||colspan=7|Boycotted
|- style="background:gold;"
| 1988||Champion ||6||5||1||0||14||6
|-
| 1992||colspan=7|did not qualify (the first age-restricted tournament)
|-
!Total ||6/20||32||24||5||3||77||30
|}

Venues

Soviet managers
The list does not include games of the senior team such as participation at the Olympic tournaments finals (1952–1980).Notes:''
 The USSR Olympic team withdrew from the football tournament at the 1984 Summer Olympics.
 Since 1991 UEFA qualifies a national under-21 football team to the Olympics.

See also
 Football in the Soviet Union
 Soviet Union national football team
 Soviet Union national under-21 football team
 Soviet Union national under-19 football team

References

External links
 URSS national football team website

1959 establishments in the Soviet Union
1991 disestablishments in the Soviet Union
European Olympic national association football teams
Oly
Foot